Giovanni "Gianni" Modena (born 1 September 1954) is a former Italian combined-event athlete and bobsledder.

Modena won eight national championships at individual senior level.

Achievements

Athletics

National titles
Italian Athletics Championships
Decathlon: 1972, 1975, 1977 (3)
Italian Indoor Athletics Championships
Pentathlon: 1973, 1974. 1975, 1976 (4)
Heptathlon: 1983 (1)

Bobsleigh
He competed in the four man event at the 1980 Winter Olympics.

See also
 Italy at the 1980 Winter Olympics

References

External links
 

1954 births
Living people
Italian male bobsledders
Italian decathletes
Olympic bobsledders of Italy
Bobsledders at the 1980 Winter Olympics
Place of birth missing (living people)